Pseudoradiarctia rhodesiana is a moth in the family Erebidae. It was described by George Hampson in 1900. It is found in Angola, the Democratic Republic of the Congo, Kenya, Malawi, Rwanda, South Africa, Tanzania, Uganda and Zimbabwe.

References

Moths described in 1900
Spilosomina